Nazmul Hassan Papon (born 31 May 1961) is a Bangladeshi politician and cricket administrator. He is the president of the Bangladesh Cricket Board and the member of parliament for the Kishoreganj-6 constituency.

Personal life
Nazmul Hassan Papon was born at the north Bhairab river in the Bhairabpur area, Kishoreganj, Bangladesh. His father, Zillur Rahman, was the president of Bangladesh, and mother is Ivy Rahman, a Bangladesh Awami League politician. He has two sisters, Tania Bukth and Tonyma Rahman. He completed his MBA from Institute of Business Administration, University of Dhaka.

Career

As cricket administrator
Hassan was unanimously elected as the president of Bangladesh Cricket Board in October 2013, succeeding AHM Mustafa Kamal who was appointed the Vice President of ICC. He is the first elected president of the board, his predecessors being appointed by the Government of Bangladesh. In the election, Papon competed with Saber Hasan Chowdhury. In 2021, he was re-elected as the Board president for the third term.

In 2018, he became the president of the Asian Cricket Council. After a 3-year term, he was succeeded by BCCI Secretary Jay Shah in 2021.

As politician
He has been the member of parliament of Kishoreganj-6 constituency from Bangladesh Awami League since 2009.

Others
He is the managing director of Beximco Pharmaceutical Limited and Shinepukur Ceramics Limited and a director of Beximco Group. He was the President of Abahani club for almost a decade. He headed a subcommittee in the parliament formed to investigate the manufacturing practices of pharmaceutical companies in Bangladesh.

Controversies
He criticized Shakib Al Hasan and suspended him over discipline issues.
Hassan has been involved in several controversies throughout his presidency of Bangladesh Cricket Board. He has often been alleged to force players to play including senior players like Shakib Al Hasan.

References

1961 births
Living people
University of Dhaka alumni
Bangladeshi cricket administrators
Awami League politicians
9th Jatiya Sangsad members
10th Jatiya Sangsad members
11th Jatiya Sangsad members
Sheikh Mujibur Rahman family